Dinsac is a commune in the Haute-Vienne department in the Nouvelle-Aquitaine region in western France.

Geography
The river Brame flows northwestward through the commune and forms part of its southeastern and northwestern borders.

Inhabitants are known as Dinsacois.

See also
Communes of the Haute-Vienne department

References

Communes of Haute-Vienne